Floyd Harvey Thomson (born June 14, 1949 in Capreol, Ontario) is a Canadian former ice hockey player for the St. Louis Blues of the National Hockey League (NHL).  An undrafted player, Thomson began his professional career with the International Hockey League's Fort Wayne Komets before signing with the Blues as a free agent in 1970. He played 411 NHL games, all with St. Louis, scoring 56 goals and 97 assists.  He spent the majority of his last five seasons in the Central Hockey League with the Salt Lake Golden Eagles where he was a Second and First Team All-Star in 1978 and 1979, respectively.  Thomson retired in 1982.

Early life 
Thomson, who later earned the nickname White-Pine, was taught how to skate as a toddler by his mother and played his amateur hockey in the Northern Ontario Hockey Association with the Falonbridge-Garson organization. After spending the 1969-70 season with the IHL's Fort Wayne Komets, Thomson was invited to play summer hockey in Johannesburg, South Africa.

Pre-NHL 
Thomson spent the 1971-72 season in the former Western Hockey League with the Denver Spurs, a team he captained to a championship, the first of three rings he'd win during his minor-pro career.

National Hockey League 
Was taken under the wing of veterans Gary Sabourin, Red Berenson and Garry Unger early in his career with the Blues and is described as a player to took pride at both ends of the ice.

He arrived in St. Louis in 1971-72, scoring four goals and 10 points in 49 games. Thomson spent the next five seasons with the Blues scoring a career-high 14 goals in 1972-73. 

The Blues made the NHL playoffs in three of his six full seasons with the team and he played in 10 playoff games, collecting two assists.

Post National Hockey League 
In 1977-78 Thomson was sent down to the CHL's Salt Lake City Golden Eagles, where he was named a second-team all star. The following season he scored 41 goals and 81 points. 

Thomson spent most of the 1979-80 season with the Golden Eagles, returning to the Blues for the final 11 games of his NHL career. His Salt Lake City team won the Adams Cup that season and captured a second straight title in 1980-81, Thomson's last season in professional hockey.

Regular season and playoffs

References

External links

1949 births
Living people
Canadian expatriate ice hockey players in the United States
Canadian ice hockey left wingers
Denver Spurs players
Fort Wayne Komets players
Ice hockey people from Ontario
Sportspeople from Greater Sudbury
Kansas City Blues players
St. Louis Blues players
Salt Lake Golden Eagles (CHL) players
Undrafted National Hockey League players